The Royal Danish Navy ranks follows the NATO system of ranks and insignia, as does the rest of the Danish Defence.
Outside this ranking system there are physicians (who may wear the same insignia in the Army/Air Force but with a slight variation in the Navy), nurses and veterinarians, while priests and judicial personnel wear totally different insignia and are without rank.

Current ranks
Besides the NATO-system, the Danish defence utilizes its own system, which for the navy is as follows:

 Military personnel, level 400 (M400): Executive level: OF-5 through OF-9
 Military personnel, level 300 (M300): Operational level: OF-1 through OF-4
 Military personnel, level 200 (M200): NCO level: OR-5 through OR-9
 Military personnel, level 100 (M100): Seamen level: OR-1 through OR-4

Officers
The highest officer's rank is OF-9 (Admiral) which is reserved for the Chief of Defence (only when this seat is occupied by a naval officer). The Prince Consort of Denmark held the rank of Admiral (à la suite). Similarly, OF-8 (Vice-admiral) is reserved for the Vice Chief of Defence). OF-7 (Kontreadmiral) is used by the Chief of the Royal Danish Navy and OF-6 (Flotilleadmiral) by the chief of Danish Task Group as well as keepers of high-office positions. OF-4 and OF-5 are mainly chiefs of squadrons, schools and larger vessels. OF-1 through OF-3 are used in a variety of positions.

Furthermore, officers of between the ranks of OF-9 and OF-6, have their own standards.

Enlisted
The Danish OR's also follow the NATO system, though there are no OR-6's. OR-4 (Korporal) is the highest of the M100-level ranks is and not considered a NCO-rank.

The Branch of Service logos are placed in the middle of the ranks, to signify the service.

Naval Chaplains

Historical ranks
The sleeve insignia was first introduced in the Royal Navy in 1871 and was based around the British Royal Navy. In order to become more standard, the admiral ranks were changed in 1951.

Timeline of changes

Other ranks

References

Badges of Rank for the Royal Danish Navy, 2016
Badges of Rank for the Royal Danish Navy, 2016 (in Danish)
Heraldry of the RDN (in Danish)

Royal Danish Navy
Military ranks of Denmark